C/o Kaadhal is a 2021 Indian Tamil-language slice of life anthology film directed by debutant Hemambar Jasti and produced by Raja Shekar M., K. Jeevan and I B Karthikeyan stars features Deepan N, Karthik Rathnam, Vetri and Mumtaz Sorcar. The film is the remake of 2018 Telugu film C/o Kancharapalem. The film was released on 12 February 2021.

Cast 
 Deepan N as Palani
 Karthik Rathnam as Joseph
 Vetri as Dhaadi
 Mumtaz Sorcar as Salima
 Sonia Giri as Radha
 Abitha Venkataraman as Aditi
 Swetha as Sunitha
 Ayra Palak as Bhargavi
 Master Nishesh as Velu
 Vijay Vishwanathan as Rajesh

Production 
The principal photography of the film began in mid-2019 and wrapped up in early 2020.

Soundtrack

Release 
The film was initially scheduled to release on 20 March 2020, which was later re-scheduled to 12 February 2021 due to COVID-19 lockdown in India.

Reception 
A reviewer from Behindwoods wrote that "There is the gender issues of sensitivity, the voice marauding for the dignity of labour, the ill effects of caste, religion and the so called social strata. In piecing together the collective happenings in one go, Jasti warms up to provide a fare, high in quality and content save for those little deviation when the  plot widens and anxiety looms large from the audience perspective. Clearly, the USP is the cinematography of Varun Chaphekar and Aditya Javvadi. Sweekar Agasthi’s music is the sort which lingers long after the effect has sunk in. There has to be a final thread to the anthology, which Jasti expectantly reserves it in the climactic act. Nothing forced on the audience is the deserving pat on the production house." Haricharan Pudipeddi of Hindustan Times stated "Unlike the original, Care of Kaadhal is set in Madurai which is a bigger city than Kancharapalem. In C/O Kancharapalem, the city played a character by itself but it isn’t the case with the remake. Another aspect where the remake fails to match the original is in the casting. The original introduced 86 debutant actors and each character looked so authentic on screen. Apart from these few minor grouses, Care of Kaadhal works as effectively as the original and it leaves you smiling in the end."

References

External links 
 

2021 films
2020s Tamil-language films
Social realism in film
Films set in Madurai
Tamil remakes of Telugu films
Indian anthology films
Slice of life films
2021 directorial debut films
Indian avant-garde and experimental films
Films about courtesans in India
Films shot in Madurai
Films set in Tamil Nadu
Films shot in Tamil Nadu
Indian romantic drama films